Glen Canyon National Recreation Area (shortened to Glen Canyon NRA or GCNRA) is a national recreation area and conservation unit of the United States National Park Service that encompasses the area around Lake Powell and lower Cataract Canyon in Utah and Arizona, covering  of mostly rugged high desert terrain. The recreation area is named for Glen Canyon, which was flooded by the Glen Canyon Dam, completed in 1966, and is now mostly submerged beneath the waters of Lake Powell.

Glen Canyon NRA borders Capitol Reef National Park and Canyonlands National Park on the north, Grand Staircase–Escalante National Monument on the west, Vermilion Cliffs National Monument and the northeasternmost reaches of Grand Canyon National Park on the southwest, and the Navajo Nation on the southeast. The southwestern end of Glen Canyon NRA in Arizona can be accessed via U.S. Route 89 and State Route 98. State Route 95 and State Route 276 lead to the northeastern end of the recreation area in Utah.

Glen Canyon NRA was established in 1972 "to provide for public use and enjoyment and to preserve the area's scientific, historic, and scenic features." The stated purpose of Glen Canyon NRA is for recreation as well as preservation (whereas a national park may carry more emphasis on natural preservation). As such, the area has been developed for access to Lake Powell via five marinas, four public campgrounds, two small airports, and numerous houseboat rental concessions.

Geology

The geology of the area is dominated by the Glen Canyon Group, consisting of the Navajo Sandstone, Kayenta Formation, and Wingate Sandstone. The entire stratigraphic section includes rocks dating from the Cretaceous to Pennsylvanian periods.

Recreation

Several local marinas and sports outfitters provide houseboats, powerboats, jet skis, kayaks, fishing gear, and related equipment to visitors.

Graffiti Removal and Intervention Team (GRIT)
With millions of visitors to the recreation area each year, it is inevitable that vandals will deface the rock faces of the canyon. Glen Canyon NRA has implemented a voluntourism program wherein volunteers sign up for a five-day houseboat trip during which they help remove graffiti from the canyon walls.

See also
 Glen Canyon Institute
 Rainbow Bridge National Monument

References

External links

 Official National Park Service site
 Official National Park Service Concessionaire Site Lake Powell Resorts & Marinas, managed by Aramark, is an authorized concessioner of the National Park Service, Glen Canyon National Recreation Area.
 Glen Canyon Conservancy
 Page Lake Powell Chamber of Commerce

 
National Park Service National Recreation Areas
Parks in Coconino County, Arizona
Tourist attractions in San Juan County, Utah
Tourist attractions in Garfield County, Utah
Tourist attractions in Kane County, Utah
Protected areas on the Colorado River